The United States has monuments to people who collaborated with the Nazis, that are located in New York, New Jersey, Illinois, Wisconsin, Ohio, Alabama, Georgia, and Michigan.

Monuments to French collaborators 

Two of the plaques installed in 2004 in the Canyon of Heroes on lower Broadway, New York City commemorating a 1931 ticker-tape parade, are for the French then-to-be Nazi collaborators Philippe Pétain and Pierre Laval. Pétain and Laval led the Vichy Regime, one of the puppet governments of Nazi Germany. During their time in charge, the Vichy government deported about 76,000 Jews to the Auschwitz concentration camp in Germany.

As of 2021, there were streets in eleven US towns and cities named after Pétain, in:

 Hartselle, Alabama;
 Prichard, Alabama;
 Yuma, Colorado;
 Abbeville, Louisiana;
 Monroe, Louisiana;
 Goffstown, New Hampshire;
 Milltown, New Jersey;
 Defiance, Ohio;
 Ellwood City, Pennsylvania;
 Nemacolin, Pennsylvania; and
 Dallas, Texas.
Unlike other Nazi collaborators, Pétain is unique insofar as nearly all monuments to him were created before he collaborated with Nazis, as a result of his World War I activities. France renamed all streets that were named after him by 2011, and plans to honour him were reversed by French president Emmanuel Macron in 2018, after a public outcry.

New Jersey monument to Belarusian collaborators 

There is a monument with the words "those who fought for freedom and independence of Byelorussia" in South River, New Jersey. It is located on a hill behind the St. Euphrosynia Belarusian Orthodox Church. The monument has the seal of the Belarusian Central Council (Nazi puppet government, seeking freedom from the USSR) on it.

Monuments to Ukrainian collaborators

Wisconsin 
A Ukrainian Youth Association in Baraboo near Wisconsin Dells has monuments to two Ukrainian Nazi collaborators, Stepan Bandera and Roman Shukhevych. Bandera was a leader of Organization of Ukrainian Nationalists and a Nazi collaborator. Shukhevych was one of the leaders of the Ukrainian Insurgent Army that massacred thousands of Jews and tens of thousands of Polish civilians. He was also one of the commanders of Nachtigall Battalion,  of the German Schutzmannschaft 201 auxiliary police battalion. The location made news in 2018 when a photograph of youths doing Nazi salutes circulated online.

New York 
The "Heroes" monument in Ellenville incorporates busts of Roman Shukhevych and Stepan Bandera, both Nazi collaborators.

A monument to Organization of Ukrainian Nationalists and Ukrainian Insurgent Army was unveiled in Hamptonburgh in 1989. The United States Holocaust Memorial Museum criticised the monument in 2018.

Monuments to Russian collaborators 

A monument to the Russian Liberation Army and Soviet General Andrey Vlasov is situated in the Novo-Diveevo Russian Orthodox convent in Nanuet, New York. Vlasov defected from the Red Army to the Nazis in 1944.

Monuments to Lithuanian collaborators 
A monument to Adolfas Ramanauskas was erected in 2019 outside the Lithuanian World Center in Lemont, Illinois. Ramanauskas commanded one of the many Lithuanian Activist Front antisemitic "self-defence" groups. Initial plans to situate the monument on public land were halted in 2018 by local authorities.

Monuments to Serbian collaborators 

A bust of Pavle Đurišić is located in Chetnik Heroes Park, Saint Sava Serbian Orthodox Monastery and Seminary in Libertyville, Illinois. Đurišić was awarded the Iron Cross by the Nazis after his collaboration with them in Montenegro when he commanded the Chetnik troops.

Monuments to Chetniks founder Dragoljub Mihailović are located in six US cities including Cleveland, Ohio, Milwaukee, San Marcos, California and Libertyville, Illinois.  Mihailović collaborated with the Nazis and his organization both murdered Jews and deported them to the Nazis. He was executed by the Yugoslav government for his collaboration with Adolf Hitler.

Monuments to German Nazis and German collaborators 

A Wernher von Braun quote is displayed the U.S. Space and Rocket Center in Huntsville, Alabama. Von Braun was a key part of Operation Paperclip that imported Nazi scientists to help construct US weapons after World War II. During WWII, as an SS officer, von Braun oversaw the construction of V-2 rockets for the Nazis, using labour from the Mittelbau-Dora concentration camp. 

Huntsville has several other monuments to von Braun owned by the federal government, state government and municipal government. The City of Huntsville owns an entertainment complex called the Von Braun Center. There is a plaque to Von Braun outside the centre, which includes an ice rink and a concert hall. A street in Huntsville is known as Von Braun Drive Northwest. The public University of Alabama has a Wernher Von Braun Research Hall. The university's website lauds von Braun and is silent on his Nazi history. The Redstone Arsenal near Huntsville has a Von Braun Complex used mostly by the Missile Defense Agency.The Dr. Kurt H. Debus Conference Facility located within Kennedy Space Center in Merritt Island, Florida is named after Kurt H. Debus, who was the centre's inaugural director after working as a Nazi scientist and exploiting labour from concentration camps.

The city of Herndon, Virginia renamed Ferdinand Porsche Drive to Woodland Pointe Avenue in October 2022. Nazi Ferdinand Porsche designed cars and weapons, including the Tiger Tank and used slave labour at the Porsche factory in Stuttgart.

See also 

 List of Nazi monuments in Canada
 List of Holocaust memorials and museums in the United States

References 

Collaborators with Nazi Germany
World War II memorials in the United States
Statues in the United States
Germany–United States relations